David Anthony "Dave" Guy is an American trumpet player and member of The Dap-Kings. Over his more than two decade career, he has been part of the groups Sharon Jones & The Dap-Kings, Menahan Street Band, The Budos Band, and Lee Fields & The Expressions, among others. Since 2014, he has played with The Roots on The Tonight Show Starring Jimmy Fallon. A prolific touring and session musician, he often works with producer Mark Ronson and can be heard playing on tracks including "Valerie" and "Uptown Funk."

Guy has also played with Antibalas, The Sugarman 3, El Michels Affair, and Charles Tolliver's Big Band, and toured as part of Amy Winehouse's band. As part of Sharon Jones & the Dap-Kings, he was nominated for the Grammy Award for Best R&B Album in 2014.

Guy was born and raised in Manhattan. He attended LaGuardia High School and studied music performance at the Manhattan School of Music and The New School, graduating in 2000. While still in high school, he formed the hip hop band Dujeous?.

References 

American trumpeters
Living people
American jazz trumpeters
American soul musicians
Musicians from New York City
Antibalas members
1978 births
Sharon Jones & The Dap-Kings members
Jazz musicians from New York (state)